Aircraft type clubs are organizations that provide information and support to a single aircraft type or a group of aircraft types from the same manufacturer or family of aircraft.

There are hundreds of aircraft type clubs around the world providing services to most certified, amateur-built, warbird and ultralight aircraft types that have been produced in any significant numbers. In some cases, especially those dealing with highly popular aircraft designs, there may be two or more competing type clubs offering services for the same aircraft type or types.

Most aircraft type clubs are independent of the manufacturer. While the majority are organized as not-for-profit associations, some type clubs are run as for-profit businesses.

Services
Type clubs vary in the services they offer and how they work. Some clubs are run by one volunteer enthusiast, using a free web service to provide a website or forum. These often have minimal publications or services. Some of the largest types clubs have full-time professional staff and offer a full range of services. Many are non-profits, but some are for-profit companies.
 
Services offered by type clubs can include:
A magazine
News and events
A website
Technical question support from aircraft type experts
Buyers guides
Conventions
Fly-ins
Information on Airworthiness Directives
Information on Supplemental Type Certificates
Type-specific classified ads
Background and historical information
Maintenance tips
Aircraft parts
Operating tips
Maintenance and aircraft systems courses
Aircraft type conversion training
Type-specific insurance (at group discounted rates)
Formation flying training
Scholarships

References

External links
 Listing of type clubs

Aviation organizations